The Dolgan language is a Turkic language with around 1,000 speakers, spoken in the Taymyr Peninsula in Russia. The speakers are known as the Dolgans. The word "Dolgan" means 'tribe living on the middle reaches of the river'. This is most likely signifying the geographical location of the Dolgan tribe.

The language is very local and restricted to a certain area and has declined in usage over the years. As of 2010 there are only about 1,050 speakers of the language. The language has expressed a few changes since the beginning of its formation, such as alphabet and phrasing terms. The issue as of recently has become the weak integration of this local language within families with mixed marriages. Instead of speaking either of the parents' local languages, the family incorporates Russian as the more dominant language to ease interfamilial and external communication. This results in children learning the language only slightly or as a second language. Over generations, the language continues to fade.

Classification 
Dolgan, along with its close relative Sakha (Yakut), belongs to the North Siberian subbranch of the Turkic language family. Like most other Turkic languages, Dolgan has vowel harmony, agglutinative morphology, subject-object-verb word order, and lacks grammatical gender.

Sample comparison with Yakut (in Latin)

Geographical distribution

Official status 
Dolgan is established as a dominant language in the Taymyr Peninsula.

Dialects/Varieties 
Three Dolgan subgroups:
 Western – Yenisei, Norilsk
 Central – Avam
 Eastern – Khatanga
All dialects are understood among each other, despite subtle differences. Yakut is also understood among all since it is so similar.

History 
The Dolgan language started out having a Latin alphabet in the early 20th century. Over time, the Cyrillic alphabet was implemented instead since it is the same alphabet used by the related language, Yakut. Evenki's influence on Dolgan can explain, in part, why it is considered a separate language from Yakut. Dolgan has made appearances in newspapers, such as the Taymyr, as well as schools starting around the time of the 60s. However, now there are only around 1,050 speakers of the Dolgan language.

Certain words in the language were developed from geographical implications that have been present since the start of the Dolgan language. For instance, the directional terms ta¯s (1. south 2. east) and muora (1. north 2. west) are representative of the corresponding landscapes. Ta¯s is related to the word stone, and the southeast topography of the native region, Taymyr Peninsula, is covered by the Putorana Mountains. Similarly, muora denotes "sea" where the western zone of Taimyr has access to the sea shore.

However, this is not true for all directional terms, nor all words of the Dolgan language. Southwest, uhä, and northeast, allara, have no significance in geographical terms relative to Taymyr.

Grammar

Morphology 
The composition of morphological categories in the noun is: case, number, possession, and in the verb is: voice, aspect, mode, time, person and number. In contrast in the Yakut language, the partitive is used in the possessive declension to address the accusative case, and joint case serves to structure two similar parts of a sentence. In conjugation of a verb in the common form of -ааччы, the paradigms of Dolgan inclination were preserved with the word баар.

Phonology

Vowels

Consonants 

Dolgan has the following phonetic characteristics:
 Diphthongisation of the Turkish medium vowels [o, e, ö] in the root syllable
 Labial and palatal vowel harmony in the native words
 Transition of the initial Turkish c- into h- , loss of the uvular x, ҕ: Yakut ; саха ~ Dolgan hака (self)

Vocabulary 

Much of the old Yakut Language was lost.
 Lack of modern political and scientific terminology.
 Change in the meaning of words under the influence of the Turkish semantic system.
 Extensive borrowing from the Russian language.

Writing system 
Over time, the language itself has changed and adapted. Even during the time period when it had a Cyrillic alphabet, it changed over the years. The first version of alphabet of the language had the following appearance: А а, Б б, В в, Г г, Д д, Дь дь, Е е, Ё ё, Ж ж, З з, И и, Иэ иэ, Й й, К к, Л л, М м, Н н, Ӈ ӈ, Нь нь, О о, Ө ө, П п, Р р, С с, Т т, У у, Уо уо, Ү ү, Үө үө, Ф ф, Х х, Һ һ, Ц ц, Ч ч, Ш ш, Щ щ, Ъ ъ, Ы ы, Ыа ыа, Ь ь, Э э, Ю ю, Я я.

The current Dolgan alphabet is still Cyrillic and looks as follows:

Examples (with phonetics) 
Hello : Дорообо [doroːbo]

Mountain : Кайа [kaja]

Mother : Иньэ [inˈe]

I love you : Мин энигин таптыыбын [min eniɡin taptɯɯbɯn]

Birthday : Төрөөбүт күн [tørøøbyt kyn]

Day after tomorrow : Өйүүн [øjyyn]

Dog : Ыт [ɯt]

See also 

 Dolgans

References

Bibliography 
 Ager, Simon. (2011). Dolgan. Omniglot. Retrieved from http://www.omniglot.com/writing/ dolgan.htm.
 Dolgikh, B. O. (1963). Proiskhozhdenie Dolgan (Origin of the Dolgan). Trudy Instituta, Etnografii AN SSSR 84:92-141.
 Grachyova, Galina. (1990). Dolgan. In Collis, Dirmid R. F. (ed.), Arctic Languages: An Awakening, 112-114.
 Grenoble, Lenore A. and Lindsay J. Whaley. (2006). Saving Languages: An Introduction to Language Revitalization. Cambridge: Cambridge University Press.
 
 Lewis, E. Glyn. (1971). Migration and Language in the USSR. The International Migration Review: The Impact of Migration on Language Maintenance and Language Shift, 5(2), 147-179. 
 Li, Yong-Sŏng. (2011). A study of Dolgan. (Altaic language series, 05.) Seoul: Seoul National University Press.
 
  
 
 Marten, H.F., Rießler, M., Saarikivi, J., Toivanen, R. (2015). Cultural and Linguistic Minorities in the Russian Federation and the European Union: Comparative Studies on Equality and Diversity. Switzerland: Springer.
 Minahan, James B. (2014). Dolgan in Ethnic Groups of North, East, and Central Asia: An Encyclopedia. (63-67). Santa Barbara: ABC-CLIO, LLC.
 Vahtre, Lauri. (1991). The Dolgans. The Red Book. Retrieved from https://www.eki.ee/books/ redbook/dolgans.shtml.

Further reading 
 Stachowski, M.: Dolganischer Wortschatz, Kraków 1993 (+ Dolganischer Wortschatz. Supplementband, Kraków 1998).
 Stachowski, M.: Dolganische Wortbildung, Kraków 1997.

External links 
 Dolgan DoReCo corpus compiled by Chris Lasse Däbritz, Nina Kudryakova, Eugénie Stapert and Alexandre Arkhipov. Audio recordings of narrative texts with transcriptions time-aligned at the phone level, translations, and time-aligned morphological annotations.

Agglutinative languages
Taymyr Autonomous Okrug
Krasnoyarsk Krai
Languages of Russia
Siberian Turkic languages
Subject–object–verb languages
Dolgans
Turkic languages